Grințieș is a commune in Neamț County, Western Moldavia, Romania. It is composed of three villages: Bradu, Grințieș, and Poiana.

Grințieș is situated in the central part of the Eastern Romanian Carpathians, between the Bistrița Mountains and the Ceahlău Massif. It lies on the banks of the  Bistricioara, close to where the river joins the Bistrița, at the upper end of Lake Izvorul Muntelui (also known as Lake Bicaz).

The commune is traversed by National Road , which connects Piatra Neamț with the city of Toplița in Harghita County.

The All Saints' Day  dates from 1793.

Natives
 Nicolae Ionescu (1820–1905), politician, jurist, and publicist

References

Communes in Neamț County
Localities in Western Moldavia